Nileema Mishra is a social worker from the Indian state of Maharashtra. She received the Ramon Magsaysay Award for Emergent Leadership in 2011.
Nileema was born into a lower-middle-class family in 1972 in the village of Bahadarpur Taluka Parola, Maharashtra, District- Jalgaon, Maharashtra.
She is a postgraduate in psychology from the University of Pune.
After her education, she worked with Vigyan Ashram, Pabal under the guidance of Dr Kalbagh.
She registered Bhagini Nivedita Gramin Vigyan Niketan formally in the year 2005 with the help of Dr Jagannath Wani.
Nileema has association with Caring Friends, Mumbai and Let's Dream foundation, Delhi. She donated her award money to her Bhagini Nivedita Gramin Vigyan Niketan, which helps poor women through micro-financing. She was awarded Padma Shri in 2013 for social work.

References 

Living people
Ramon Magsaysay Award winners
Recipients of the Padma Shri in social work
People from Jalgaon district
Savitribai Phule Pune University alumni
Social workers
20th-century Indian women
20th-century Indian educators
Women educators from Maharashtra
Educators from Maharashtra
Social workers from Maharashtra
Year of birth missing (living people)
20th-century women educators